June is the surname of:

 Cato June (born 1979), American former National Football League player
 Jennie June (autobiographer) (1874–?), one of the earliest transgender individuals to publish an autobiography in the United States
 Ray June (1895–1958), American Hollywood cinematographer